Doña Tomasa Ttito Condemayta Hurtado de Mendoza (1729 – 18 May 1781) was a leading force in the indigenous uprising against the Spanish colonial rulers under Tupac Amaru II in the 18th century in Peru. She was cacica of her people in the 1770s, the most powerful such ruler in her region. During the uprising, she served as both a strategist and a military officer. She was executed for her role in the rebellion alongside Tupac Amaru II, his wife Micaela Bastidas Puyucahua, and their son Hipólito Condorcanqui Bastidas.

Personal life
Tomasa Tito Condemayta was born in 1729 to an Inca noble family in an area of Peru that is now the Acomayo province in the Cusco region. Her parents were Sebastián Tito Condemayta, kuraka of the Tito Condemayta ayllu and godfather of Tupac Amaru II, and Alfonsa Hurtado de Mendoza. Sources give contradictory information as to her domestic life. In a 2005 work, scholar David Garrett stated that she was married to Tomas Escalante and bore him a daughter, who wed the cacique of Papres, Evaristo Delgado. In a 2008 article, Garrett stated that she was married to Faustino Delgado.

Unusually for the area, the Tito Condemayta ayllu embraced a lengthy hereditary rule, and Tito Condemayta became cacica of her people after her father, standing as the most powerful in the area.

Rebellion 
When Tupac Amaru II and his wife Micaela Bastidas Puyucahua called for a rebellion against Spanish rule in Peru in 1780, Condemayta left her husband and children to join the rebels in Tinta. Her embrace of the rebellion was not universal within her family, as her son-in-law, Evaristo Delgado, remained loyal to the Spanish throne.

Condemayta played an important role in the rebellion. Together with Amaru, she mobilized indigenous women for the uprising. She was a military strategist as well as an officer leading her own women's battalion. A wealthy woman, she also helped fund the rebellion, supplying silver and essential supplies. In the battle of Sangarara, a women's army under Condemayta's command defeated a Spanish army. She also led the successful defense of the bridge Pillpintuchaka on the Apurimac against approaching Spaniards. Thousands of women fought using slingshots and arrows against armored Spanish soldiers. Under her command, her troops held the Pilpinto pass for over a month. In 1781, fortunes turned to the much better-armed Spaniards, and on April 7, Condemayta was captured, along with Tupac Amaru II and Bastidas Puyucahua and their sons Hipólito and Fernando.

On May 18, 1781, Condemayta was executed after severe torture together with Tupac Amaru II and Micaela Bastidas Puyucahua and their son Hipólito Condorcanqui Bastidas in the main square of Cusco. She was the only native noble executed alongside the rebel leader. After being asphyxiated slowly with a hand-cranked metal garrote especially constructed for the occasion, she was hanged to ensure she was truly dead. Her impaled head was set up as a deterrent in Acos.

References and notes

Further reading
 Jerome R. Adams: Notable Latin American Women. Twenty-Nine Leaders, Rebels, Poets, Battlers and Spies. McFarland & Co., Jefferson (North Carolina) 1995. "The Revolt of the Incas", p. 71.
 Juvenal Pacheco Farfán: Tomasa T'ito Condemayta, heroína de Acos: hito histórico y paradigm de liberación de la mujer. JL Editores, Cusco 2008.
 Juan José Vega: Micaela Bastidas y las heroinas tupamaristas. Ediciones Universidad Nacional de Educación, Lima 1971. 23 pages.

Women in 18th-century warfare
History of Peru
Indigenous activists of the Americas
1729 births
1781 deaths
18th-century Peruvian people
Women in war in South America
Executed revolutionaries
Peruvian revolutionaries
Executed Peruvian women
People executed by New Spain
18th-century executions by Spain
Native American women in warfare